Kotgarh is a village and a sub-tehsil in Kumarsain subdivision of Shimla district in the Indian state of Himachal Pradesh. Formerly under the British Raj, it was the capital of Kotkhai-Kotgarh princely state, which was later shifted to Kiari in Kotkhai. Kotgarh was incorporated into British India in 1815 and later to India in 1947.

It was in this village, where Satyanand Stokes planted first American apple tree in India in 1916. Kotgarh is known as the apple bowl of India, due to its high quality of apple and cherry cultivation.

Notables 	

1) Shri Satyanand Stokes - Horticulturist who settled and introduced American variety apple cultivation first time in India in Kotgarh.

2) Smt. Vidya Stokes - Former MLA and cabinet minister of Himachal Pradesh.

References

Villages in Shimla district